A tripwire is a mechanical assembly designed to detect an anticipated type of target, and to trigger an apparatus that acts upon or records information about, that target.
"Tripwire" also may refer to one of the following:

Technology
 Open Source Tripwire, open source intrusion detection software
 Tripwire (company), a software company that builds and sells commercial versions of Tripwire-based software

Military doctrine
 Tripwire force, a small but credible military force acting as a strategic deterrent, with the understanding that any hostility directed against said force or area would ignite an armed conflict between two powers; for example, the NATO and U.S. forces deployed in the Baltic states as part of Operation Atlantic Resolve.

Books 
 Tripwire (novel), by Lee Child
 Tripwire (2010), by Steve Cole (writer)

Film and television
 Tripwire (film) 1990 American film directed by James Lemmo
 Tripwire, documentary on Aboriginal soldiers in Australia narrated by musician Archie Roach 1995

Games and comics
 Tripwire Interactive, a video game developer
 Tripwire (G.I. Joe), a character from the G.I. Joe universe